A. cinnamomea may refer to:
 Aglaia cinnamomea, a plant species found in Indonesia and Papua New Guinea
 Ancilla cinnamomea, a sea snail species

See also 
 Cinnamomea (disambiguation)